Ryūma, Ryuma or Ryuuma (written: 龍磨 or 竜馬) is a masculine Japanese given name. Notable people with the name include:

, Japanese baseball player
, Japanese shogi player

Japanese masculine given names